Norokawa Dam  is a gravity dam located in Hiroshima Prefecture in Japan. The dam is used for flood control. The catchment area of the dam is 13 km2. The dam impounds about 14  ha of land when full and can store 1700 thousand cubic meters of water. The construction of the dam was started on 1969 and completed in 1975.

References

Dams in Hiroshima Prefecture